Erika Kraft (18 November 1931 – 4 March 2003) was a German former figure skater who represented West Germany. She was the 1952 national champion and placed tenth at the 1952 Winter Olympics in Oslo, Norway. She finished 14th at the 1951 World Championships in Milan, Italy, and fourth at the 1952 European Championships in Vienna, Austria. Kraft belonged to SC Riessersee in Garmisch-Partenkirchen.

Competitive highlights

References

External links
 

1931 births
2003 deaths
Figure skaters at the 1952 Winter Olympics
German female single skaters
Olympic figure skaters of Germany
Sportspeople from Garmisch-Partenkirchen